Longfellow is a neighborhood within the larger Longfellow community in Minneapolis, United States. It is bounded by Seward to the North, Cooper to the East, Howe to the South, and Corcoran and East Phillips to the West. It was named after Henry Wadsworth Longfellow, who wrote The Song of Hiawatha. It is populated by a diverse, predominantly middle-class (working class) population. More expensive homes are located closer to the river, and almost all of the housing stock is composed of Sears Modern Homes in the Bungalow style.

The Eliel Saarinen-designed Christ Church Lutheran, First Free Methodist, and the East Lake Community Library building are located in this neighborhood.

Longfellow was the centre point of riots during the George Floyd protests in Minneapolis–Saint Paul in May 2020.

Demographics 
In 2016, the neighbourhood had a population of 5,176. The neighbourhood is ethnically diverse at 57.6% European American, 18.8% African American, 12.6% Hispanic or Latino, 4.4% of Two or more races, and 2.8% Asian American.

See also 
 Neighborhoods of Minneapolis

References

External links
The neighborhood by the falls at the Longfellow Community Council.

Neighborhoods in Minneapolis
Sears Modern Homes
Bungalow architecture in Minnesota